Andrew Taylor (born ) is an Australian male  track cyclist. He competed in the sprint event at the 2013 UCI Track Cycling World Championships.

References

External links
 Profile at cyclingarchives.com

1985 births
Living people
Australian track cyclists
Australian male cyclists
Place of birth missing (living people)
20th-century Australian people
21st-century Australian people